Saint-René is a parish in the Beauce-Sartigan Regional County Municipality in Quebec, Canada. It is part of the Chaudière-Appalaches region and the population is 946 as of 2021. It is named after Canadian martyr René Goupil.

Demographics 

References

Commission de toponymie du Québec
Ministère des Affaires municipales, des Régions et de l'Occupation du territoire

Incorporated places in Chaudière-Appalaches
Parish municipalities in Quebec